The 2005 Sacramento State Hornets football team represented California State University, Sacramento as a member of the Big Sky Conference during the 2005 NCAA Division I-AA football season. Led by third-year head coach Steve Mooshagian, Sacramento State compiled an overall record of 2–9 with a mark of 1–6 in conference play, tying for seventh place in the Big Sky. The team was outscored by its opponents 352 to 192 for the season. The Hornets played home games at Hornet Stadium in Sacramento, California.

Schedule

References

Sacramento State
Sacramento State Hornets football seasons
Sacramento State Hornets football